Branch insignia of the Islamic Republic of Iran Army refers to military emblems that may be worn on the uniform of the Iranian Army to denote membership in a particular area of expertise and series of functional areas.

General branches

Naval force branches

Air force branches

See also
 Badges of honor in Iran
 Islamic Revolutionary Guard Corps Branch Insignia
 Iranian Police Branch Insignia

Military Branch Insignia of Iranian Army
Islamic Republic of Iran Army